Star Trek: Strategic Operations Simulator is a space combat simulation arcade game based on the original Star Trek television program and movie series, and released by Sega in 1983. Star Trek uses color vector graphics for both a 2D display and a 3D first-person perspective. The player controls the Starship Enterprise and must defend sectors from invading Klingon ships. The game includes synthesized speech

The game was manufactured in two styles of cabinets: an upright standup, and a sit-down/semi-enclosed deluxe cabinet with the player's chair modeled after the Star Trek: The Motion Pictures bridge chairs with controls integrated into the chair's arms.

Star Trek was ported to the  Commodore 64, TI-99/4A, Atari 8-bit family, Atari 5200, Atari 2600, VIC-20, ColecoVision, and Apple II.

Gameplay
The player is presented with multiple views of the play field. Survival depends on the player's ability to effectively use and manage shield energy, photon torpedoes, and warp energy. These are replenished by docking with starbases, which sometimes must be saved from destruction at the hands of the Klingons.

The controls use a weighted spinner for ship heading control and buttons to activate the impulse engines, warp engines, phasers, and photon torpedoes. The phaser button is simply marked "fire."

Reception
Electronic Games stated in August 1983 that "Star Trek is sure to be a top-grosser in the arcades this year. If you can squeeze through the crowd around the machine, you may never want to leave."

ANALOG Computing wrote in January 1984 that the Atari 8-bit version "sounds a lot like Star Raiders (a classic worth aspiring to). Purists will shake their heads and say 'The first is always the best,' and in this case I must agree with them", adding that the arcade version was superior. The magazine concluded that "This incarnation of Star Trek probably won't impress a hard-core Atari computer gamer".

About 500 arcade machines were given away as part of a promotion for Halfsies cereal between 1982 and 1983.

In 2016, Den of Geek ranked Strategic Operations Simulator as one of the top four Star Trek games.

References

External links

Star Trek: Strategic Operations Simulator at GameFAQs
Star Trek: Strategic Operations Simulator at the Internet Archive 

1983 video games
Apple II games
Atari 2600 games
Atari 5200 games
Atari 8-bit family games
ColecoVision games
Commodore 64 games
VIC-20 games
North America-exclusive video games
Gremlin Industries games
Sega arcade games
Starship simulators based on Star Trek
Strategic Operations Simulator
TI-99/4A games
Vector arcade video games
Video games developed in the United States
Single-player video games